Australian Imperial Force may refer to:
 First Australian Imperial Force, raised in 1914 to fight in World War I, and disbanded in 1921
 Second Australian Imperial Force, raised in 1939 to fight in World War II, and ceasing to exist in 1947